Law and Order Party as a proper name may refer to:
 Law and Order Party of Rhode Island, a short-lived political party in the U.S. state of Rhode Island in the 1840s
 Law and Order Party, a pro-slavery party in Kansas during the Bleeding Kansas period
 For Each and Every One (Latvian: Katram un katrai, KuK), a Latvian political party previously known as Law and Order (Latvian: Likums un kārtība, LuK)
 A faction opposed to the 1856 San Francisco Committee of Vigilance